Mark Speir (born April 28, 1968) is an American football coach. He is a senior analyst at Appalachian State University. Speir served as the head football coach at Western Carolina University from 2012 to 2021, compiling record of 33–68. He was released from his duties on April 9, 2021. Speir previously served as an assistant coach at Western Carolina, Presbyterian College, Elon University, and Appalachian State.

Coaching career
Speir started his coaching career while an undergraduate at Clemson, working as a student assistant from 1986 to 1989. He then spent six seasons on Steve Hodgin's staff at Western Carolina, coaching running backs from 1991 to 1993, linebackers in 1994, and the defensive line in 1995 and 1996 while also serving as recruiting coordinator. Speir moved to then-NCAA Division II Presbyterian in 1997, serving on Daryl Dickey's staff through the 1999 season. In 2000, he was hired to Al Seagraves' staff at Elon, where he served until 2002. In 2003, Speir was hired to Jerry Moore's staff at Appalachian State to serve as recruiting coordinator and to coach running backs. From 2005 to 2009, Speir coached the defensive line, and coach defensive ends and inside linebackers in 2010 and 2011, respectively. Speir was on the staff that won three consecutive national championships in 2005, 2006, and 2007. In 2009, Speir was named NCAA Division I FCS Assistant Coach of the Year by the AFCA.

Western Carolina
On December 22, 2011, Speir was named head coach at Western Carolina, replacing the outgoing Dennis Wagner. Speir opened his first season as head coach with a 42–14 win over Mars Hill, and finished his first season with a record of 1–10. Following a 2–10 season in 2013, Speir led the Catamounts to a 7–5 record in 2014, their first winning season since 2001. Spier was granted a four-year extension following the 2014 season. He followed up this success with a 7–4 record in 2015, just missing the FCS playoffs. After a disappointing 2–9 record in 2016, Speir rebounded in 2017 with a 7–5 record. After 3–8, 3–9, and 1–8 seasons in 2018, 2019, and 2020–21, Speir was let go as head coach on April 9, 2021. He finished with a 33–68 record at Western Carolina. 

During his tenure at Western Carolina, four players under Speir signed National Football League (NFL) contracts: Keion Crossen, Detrez Newsome, Ian Berryman, and John Brannon (American football). Speir also coached two record-setting Catamount quarterbacks, Troy Mitchell and Tyrie Adams.

Head coaching record

References

External links
 Appalachian State profile
 Western Carolina profile

1968 births
Living people
Appalachian State Mountaineers football coaches
Elon Phoenix football coaches
Presbyterian Blue Hose football coaches
Western Carolina Catamounts football coaches
Clemson University alumni
People from Kannapolis, North Carolina